Ponce de Leon is a town in Holmes County, Florida, United States. The population was 598 at the 2010 census, up from 457 at the 2000 census. From 2000 to 2010, the Ponce de Leon town population growth percentage was 30.9%.

Geography

Ponce de Leon is located in southwestern Holmes County at  (30.725783, –85.937783). U.S. Route 90 runs through the center of town, leading northeast  to Bonifay, the Holmes County seat, and west  to DeFuniak Springs. Florida State Road 81 crosses US 90 near the center of town, leading north  to the Alabama border and south  to Florida State Road 20 at Bruce. Interstate 10 passes through the southern part of Ponce de Leon, with access from Exit 96 (SR 81). I-10 leads east  to Tallahassee and west  to Pensacola.

The town is in the valley of Sandy Creek, a south-flowing tributary of the Choctawhatchee River. Ponce de Leon Springs State Park is in the southern part of the town, north of I-10, along both sides of Sandy Creek. The entrance is on the eastern side of the park off Ponce de Leon Springs Road.

Demographics

As of the census of 2010, there were 598 people, 246 households, and 131 families residing in the town. The racial makeup of the town was 91.60% White, 1.80% African American, 2.41% Native American, 1.00% from other races, and 2.00% from two or more races. Hispanic or Latino of any race were 3.00% of the population.

There were 200 households, out of which 30.0% had children under the age of 18 living with them, 48.5% were married couples living together, 11.5% had a female householder with no husband present, and 34.5% were non-families. 29.5% of all households were made up of individuals, and 14.5% had someone living alone who was 65 years of age or older.  The average household size was 2.29 and the average family size was 2.82.

In the town, the population was spread out, with 24.9% under the age of 18, 6.3% from 18 to 24, 24.9% from 25 to 44, 28.0% from 45 to 64, and 15.8% who were 65 years of age or older.  The median age was 40 years. For every 100 females, there were 94.5 males.  For every 100 females age 18 and over, there were 92.7 males.

The median income for a household in the town was $25,521, and the median income for a family was $33,250. Males had a median income of $26,339 versus $13,750 for females. The per capita income for the town was $14,673.  About 16.9% of families and 19.3% of the population were below the poverty line, including 22.2% of those under age 18 and 19.4% of those age 65 or over.

See also

 Ponce de Leon Springs State Park

References

Towns in Holmes County, Florida
Towns in Florida
Former census-designated places in Florida